Maxim Khudyakov (born August 18, 1986) is a Kazakhstani professional ice hockey forward who has played for the Saryarka Karagandy team in the Higher Hockey League.

References

External links
 

1986 births
Living people
Sportspeople from Oskemen
Kazakhstani ice hockey centres
Barys Nur-Sultan players
Gornyak Rudny players
Kazakhmys Satpaev players
Saryarka Karagandy players
Asian Games gold medalists for Kazakhstan
Medalists at the 2011 Asian Winter Games
Asian Games medalists in ice hockey
Ice hockey players at the 2011 Asian Winter Games